Carpoglyphidae is a mite family in the order Astigmatina, containing four genera:
Carpoglyphus Robin, 1869
Coproglyphus Türk & Türk in Stammer 1957
Dichotomiopus Fain & A. M. Camerik, 1978
Pullea Canestrini, 1884

References

External links 

Sarcoptiformes
Taxa named by Anthonie Cornelis Oudemans
Acari families